Al-Qaʿqāʿ ibn ʿAmr ibn Mālik Al-Tamīmī was an Arab Muslim commander and general in the Rashidun army, he belonged to the tribe of Banu Tamim. He and his tribe converted to Islam possibly during the time of Ahnaf ibn Qais. He is known as a successful Military Commander who took part in two important victorious battles in early Muslim Conquest, the Battle of Yarmouk against the Byzantine Empire (commanded by Khalid ibn al-Walid) and the Battle of al-Qadisiyyah against the Sassanian Empire which was led by Sa`d ibn Abi Waqqas. The Caliph Abu Bakr praised him as an equal to eleven thousand men so in return the caliph predecessor, caliph Umar only sent him and a handful bodyguards as reinforcement to Al-Qadissiyah as the first wave as reinforcement. making him one of the most Illustrious military figures in that era.

Life

Ridda wars
Qa'qa ibn Amr At-tamimi converted along with his tribe, in the Year of the delegations, 631. But, for a brief period, he and other Tamim joined the force of false prophetess Sajah bint al-Harith before she was subdued during Ridda wars later on he carried successful military career under Khalid bin Walid suppressing another false prophet Tulayha in the Battle of Buzakha. after the Ridda wars has been ended he continued to follow Khalid's campaign to Syria and Iraq.

Muslim conquest of Iraq and Syria 
Qa'qa is taking part in the Battle of Chains and in one occasion when Qa'qa saw Khalid duelling the Sassanid champion Hormuzan,
Qa'qa immediately rushed as he saw Hormuz sent 5 to 6 soldiers to aid him swarming over Khalid to intercept the duel Then Qa'qa and Khalid overcame Hormuzan and his guards, killing all the Sassanid soldiers who intended to kill Khalid amid the duel in the process, along with Hormuzan.
 During this battle its reported that Qa'qa said "We did trample Hormuz with fury restrained...".

Later, as incensed Christian Arabs of this area seeking revenge for their leader Aqqa who has fallen in the Battle of Al-Anbar. they contacted the Persian commander named Bahman who in turn divided the Persian-Arab forces into two field armies and sent them off from Ctesiphon. the first force under Ruzbeh moved to Husaid, and the other, under Zarmahr, moved to Khanafis. For the moment these two armies were located in separate areas for ease of movement and administration, but they were not to proceed beyond these locations until the Christian Arabs were ready for battle. Bahman planned to concentrate the entire imperial army to either await a Muslim attack or march south to fight the Muslims at Hira.

This situation has been anticipated Khalid before his arrival at Hira from Dumat Al-Jandal as he divided the Muslim garrison of Hira into two corps, one of which he placed under Qaqa and the other under Abu Laila. Khalid sent them both to Ain-ul-Tamr, where he would join them a little later after the troops who had fought at Dumat Al-Jandal had been rested. The forces of Qa'qa consisted of two divisions of migrator tribe warriors that named "The Righteous"(al-Bararah) and "The Best"(al-Khiyarah), whereas the al-Khiyarah division was led by 'Ismah ibn Abdallah.

As the forces of Qa'qa' has met Zarmahr in the Battle of Husayd, while Abu Laila met Ruzbih in Khanafis, Qa'qa' immediately commanded his forces to gallop forward as per instruction of Khalid before whenever he meets an enemy force on his ways. Zarmahr in response immediately asked Ruzbeh, who is blocked by the forces of Abu laila, to aid his forces instead rather than engaging Abu Laila. Qa'qa' personally slew Zarmahr while Ruzbih in turn killed by 'Ismah. Thereafter the Muslims charged. After some the battle continues, the Persians and their allies started to realized their losses immediately retreat to Khanafis.

When the Persian garrison at Khanafis came to know of the Persian defeat at Huseid and of the death of their own Commander Zarmahr, Mabhuzab and his forces abandoned Khanafis and with his forces moved to Muzayyah further north were more forces were available and defenses were stronger. When the Muslim forces under Abu Leila arrived at Khanafis, they found that there were no Persian forces to meet them.

Later, Khalid  So he make a detour to return to his main headquarter to rendezvous with Qa'qa' and Abu Laila further chasing the Persians and their Arab allies towards Muzayyah. Khalid ride in his camel instead of the horse during his return to Ayn al Tamr.

In the famous battle of Yarmouk under Khalid he served as his subordinate Officer in Mobile guard elite cavalry. subsequently taking part as 'Fire Brigade' role, plugging all weak points or reinforcing the routed line within the Muslim ranks.

The Caliph Umar ibn al-Khattāb sent Al-Qa'qa' ibn 'Amr to take part in the battle of Qadisiyya. On 17 November 636, his units reached the battlefield at noon. Before arriving, Qa’qa divided his troops into several smaller groups and instructed them to appear on the battlefield one after the other, giving the impression that large reinforcements were arriving. Qa'qa was busy raising morale and arranging his companions to the place from where he parted from them in previous day. The Persian army's elephants were a serious obstacle for the Muslims. To solve this problem, Qa’qa resorted to an ingenious device. The camels in his army were disguised to look like weird monsters. These "monsters" were moved to the Sassanid front and, upon seeing them, the Sassanid horses turned and fled. With the disorganization of the Sassanid cavalry, the Persian infantry at the left and center became exposed and vulnerable. Saad ordered an all-out attack by the Muslims. After the Persian army was routed Qa’qa ibn Amr went into pursuit and killed the Persian general Bahman, who commanded the Sasanian army at the Battle of the Bridge.

When the battle resumed on 18 November 636, al-Qa'qa' led a vanguard cavalry of three hundred accompanied by Qays bin Hazim who led the Hashim tribe kinsmen who came from Syria together with local Iraqi tribal warriors. This time they were involved in melee combat against the Sassanid elephant corps. The Muslim cavalry blinded the elephants and severed their trunks with spears and other melee weapons while the Muslim archers struck down the elephant riders. The situation became dire for the Muslims later on that day, despite having already annihilated the elephant corps, because the Sassanids fought even more ferociously, resulting in al-Qa'qa's fellow kinsmen, Khalid bin Yamar al-Tamimi, being killed in the night. Consequently, al-Qa'qa' was tasked with the initiative of reinvigorating the Muslim army.

At sunrise of 19 November 636, the fighting had ceased, but the battle was still inconclusive. Al-Qa'qa, with the consent of Saad, was now acting as a field commander of the Muslim troops. He is reported to have addressed his men as follows:

The Muslims' left center led by al-Qa’qa' surged forward and attacked the Sassanid right center, followed by the general attack of the Muslim corps. The Sassanids were taken by surprise at the resumption of battle. The Sassanids' left wing and left center were pushed back. Al-Qa’qa' again led a group of Mubarizun against the Sassanids' left center and by noon, he and his men were able to pierce through the Sassanid center.

During the Battle of Jalula Mihran engaged his troops in an open battlefield, Hashim ibn Utbah decided to carry out his maneuver. He dispatched a strong cavalry regiment under one of his most illustrious cavalry commanders; Qaqa ibn Amr to capture the bridge over the entrenchments. The bridge was not heavily guarded as virtually all the Persian troops available were used to assault Muslim army's main rank. Qaqa maneuvered around Persian right flank quickly captured the bridge at their rear. The news of a strong Muslim cavalry detachment in their rear was a serious setback to Persian morale. Hashim launched a frontal attack with Muslim infantry while Qaqa stuck at Persian rear with his cavalry. Thus resulted the Sassanid Army trapped and routed in result.

After the campaign in Jalula was ended he stayed and held a military post for a while in Kufa.

Defense of Emesa 
In 638, Emesa was laid in siege by the coalition forces of Arab Christian tribes from Jazira which mustered by Heraclius in an attempt to stimying the losses of Byzantine territories due to rapid expansion of Rashidun caliphate in Levant. On the orders of Umar, Sa'd ibn Abi Waqqas immediately sent Qa'qa with 4000 soldiers with him to aid the defenders of Emesa which led by his former superiors during the battle of Yarmouk, Abu Ubaydah and Khalid ibn Walid. Later as the Christian Arab coalitions abandoned the siege, Khalid and Qa'qa immediately came out of the fort to pursue the enemy and inflicted heavy losses to the fleeing Arab Christian coalition forces.

First Muslim civil war
During the uprising against the rule of Caliph Uthman, Qa'qa quickly suppressed the revolt potential brought by Yazid bin Qays al-Arhabi. Many times he went using his own reputation as the hero of The Caliphate, who was respected and feared by peoples of Kufa, to cool down the heated political atmosphere before and after caliph Uthman was murdered. He even tried to mediate the factions of caliph Amir'ul Mu'mineen Ali and Aisha to ensuing peaceful negotiation although his attempts were fruitless and the Battle of the Camel unavoided

After the civil war was ended he was purged by Muawiyah I together with other Ali supporters from Kufa and exiled to Jerusalem

Death
Despite the exile he later went back to live in Kufa, where he allegedly died later in retirement

See also
Battle of al-Qadisiyyah
Battle of Yarmouk
Banu Tamim
Jarir ibn Atiyah

References

Notes

Bibliography

Further reading

Tabi‘un
636 births
Banu Tamim
Year of death missing
Generals of the Rashidun Caliphate
Arab people of the Arab–Byzantine wars
Arab generals
People of the Muslim conquest of Persia
Companions of the Prophet